The French Bridge Federation ( - FFB) is the national organization for bridge in France.  The president is Patrick Grenthe and the treasurer is Guy Auer. There are also three vice-presidents and 29 regional committees, whose chairmen compose a federation council (conseil fédéral). The headquarters of the French Bridge Federation is in Saint-Cloud, near Paris. It was founded in 1933 and is the third largest bridge federation in the world with over 100,000 members.

The federation also organizes the French Bridge Championship (Championnat de France de bridge).

Organisation 
 President: Patrick Grenthe
 Vice-president (Communications, development, marketing): Patrick Bogacki
 Vice-president (competitions, international): Jean-Daniel Chalet
 Vice-president (Bridge university): Pierre Saguet
 Treasurer: Guy Auer
 General secretary: Patern Henry

The president, the vice-presidents, and the general secretary are elected to 4-year terms.

French bridge players
 Pierre Albarran, player and theorist
 Jean-Daniel Chalet, vice-president of the French Bridge Federation
 Pierre Jaïs, world champion
 , world champion
 Philippe Soulet, world champion
 Roger Trézel, world champion

References

External links

 

Bridge
Contract bridge governing bodies